Margret Rasfeld (born 1951) is a German author, activist and headmistress in active retirement. She is the co-founder and current managing director of the initiative  (school on the move) and has been elected Ashoka Fellow since 2015. Rasfeld advocates a reorientation of school education according to the guidelines of the UNESCO campaign Education for sustainable development (ESD).

Life 
Margret Rasfeld was born in 1951 in Gladbeck, North Rhine-Westphalia, Germany. From 1976 to 1992, she was a teacher at a Gymnasium in biology and chemistry. From 1992 to 1997, she was involved in setting up the Borbeck comprehensive school in Essen as a didactic director. From 1997 to 2007, Rasfeld built the Holsterhausen Comprehensive School, which has received many high-ranking awards for its activities in education for sustainable development.

From 2007 to 2016 she headed the Evangelical School Berlin Zentrum, which is now recognized internationally as a model for an approach "transformative education". As a result of these activities, she became a sought-after consultant and speaker in the fields of education and new work at home and abroad, as well as a consultant and trainer for teachers and school administrators.

Further activities 
2006: co-founder of buddy e.V., today education-Y
2011/2012: one of the six core experts in the Chancellor's future dialogue on how we want to learn.
2012: co-founder of the gGmbH schule-im-Aufbruch
2017: co-founder of ggc2030

Awards 

 Berliner Naturschutzpreis 2011 of the Stiftung Naturschutz Berlin
 Vision Award 2012
 querdenker Award 2013
 WeQ Award 2019

Publications 
Books

 EduAction - Wir machen Schule, zusammen mit Peter Spiegel,  Murmann Verlag GmbH 2012
 Schulen im Aufbruch - Eine Anstiftung, zusammen mit Stephan Breidenbach, Kösel-Verlag 2014, Übersetzungen: polnisch, ukrainisch, slowakisch, kroatisch, koreanisch

Essays in non-fiction books (selection)

 Pelikan/Demmer/Hurrelmann (eds) Gesundheitsförderung durch Organisationsentwicklung, Weinheim1993
 Margret Rasfeld: Gesundheitsförderung an einem Gymnasium im Kontext des Gesunde Städte Netzwerke der WHO
 Standorte, Jahrbuch Ruhrgebiet, 1999/2000, Essen 2000
 Margret Rasfeld: Die Utopien von heute sind die Wirklichkeiten von morgen. AGENDA 21 und Schule – eine Einladung zum Einmischen
 Anne Sliwka, Christian Petry, Peter E. Kalb (Hrsg.): Durch Verantwortung lernen, Beltz, Weinheim 2004
 Margret Rasfeld: Nur wenn wir ihnen etwas zutrauen: Projekt: VERANTWORTUNG – ein Konzept für die ganze Schule
 Arbeitsstelle Weltbilder(eds), Globalpatrioten. Begegnungen, Positionen und Impulse zu Klimagerechtigkeit, Biologischer und Kultureller Vielfalt, Oekom 2012
 Margret Rasfeld: Good News: Lernen bewirkt Veränderung
 Frederic Laloux, Reinventing Organizations, Nelson Parker 2014
 Frederic Laloux: Selbstführende Schüler, Lehrer und Eltern - eine evolutionäre Schule
 Volker Heyse (eds), Aufbruch in die Zukunft. Erfolgreiche Entwicklungen von Schlüsselkompetenzen in Schulen und Hochschulen, Waxmann 2014
 Margret Rasfeld: Was heute zu lernen für morgen wichtig ist. Ein Paradigmenwechsel
 Meinel, Weinberg, Krohn (eds): Design Thinking Live, Murmann 2015
 Schule neu denken
 Jahrbuch Bildung für nachhaltige Entwicklung, Neue Ziele, Wien 2017
 Die Schule von morgen ist ein Basislager
 Barz H. (eds), Handbuch Bildungsreform und Reformpädagogik. 2018 Springer VS, Wiesbaden
 Margret Rasfeld: Ein reformpädagogisches Netzwerk entwickelt internationale Strahlkraft
 Margret Rasfeld: Reformpädagogik an katholischen und evangelischen Schulen
 Günter Faltin (eds), Handbuch Entrepreneurship, Springer 2018
 Margret Rasfeld: Die Evangelische Schule Berlin Zentrum - eine Schule mit Entrepreneural Spirit
 Marianne Gronert/Alban Schraut (eds), Handbuch Vereine der Reformpädagogik, Ergon 2018
 Margret Rasfeld: Die Initiative Schule im Aufbruch
 Alfred Herrhausen Gesellschaft (eds) Weiter.Denken.Ordnen.Gestalten. Mutige Gedanken zu den Fragen unserer Zeit, Siedler 2019
 Margret Rasfeld: Plädoyer für ein radikal neues Bildungsmodell
 Anabel Ternes von Hattburg/Matthias Schäfer(eds), Digitalpakt – was nun?: Ideen und Konzepte für zukunftsorientiertes Lernen, Springer 2020
 Margret Rasfeld: Digitalisierung allein macht noch keine Bildungstransformation. Für einen Systemwechsel im Sinne einer Bildung für Nachhaltige Entwicklung sollten wir sie uns zunutze machen
 Steffi Burkhart (eds): Be Water, My Friend. Was Menschen, Teams und Organisationen von den Eigenschaften des Wassers lernen können,  Vahlen 2020
 Margret Rasfeld: Die Gesellschaft denkt um – ein neues Paradigma des Lernens

Essays in journals (selection):

 Praxis Schule 1/2014: Margret Rasfeld-Die Freiheit nutzen
 SchulVerwaltung spezial, 5/2014: Margret Rasfeld - Von der Sitz-und Schreibschule raus in die Lebenswirklichkeit
 SchulVerwaltung Österreich, 3/2017: Margret Rasfeld -Aufbruch zu einer neuen Lernkultur
 Gemeinsam Lernen, 3/2018: Margret Rasfeld - Das Neue wagen. Für die Welt in der wir leben wollen!
 Pädagogische Führung, 5/2019: Margret Rasfeld - Plädoyer für eine radikale Neuausrichtung der Bildung
 Zeitschrift Grundschule, Westermann 2/2020: Margret Rasfeld - Das Große beginnt im Kleinen

References

External links 

 Literature from and about Margret Rasfeld in the German National Library
 Personal website 

Living people
1951 births
German women writers
German activists
Ashoka Fellows